Lucas Lezcano (born 9 July 1999) is an Argentine professional footballer who plays as a forward for Colegiales.

Career
Lezcano's career started with Chacarita Juniors. His first-team bow arrived in July 2017 in the Copa Argentina against Guillermo Brown, with the forward replacing Yefri Reyes after eighty-three minutes of a 1–0 defeat. He made his professional league debut during an Argentine Primera División home match with Temperley on 27 April 2018, which was one of three appearances in the club's relegation campaign of 2017–18.

Career statistics
.

References

External links

1999 births
Living people
Sportspeople from Buenos Aires Province
Argentine footballers
Association football forwards
Argentine Primera División players
Primera Nacional players
Chacarita Juniors footballers
Quilmes Atlético Club footballers
Club Atlético Colegiales (Argentina) players